NGC 3309 is a giant elliptical galaxy located about 200 million light-years away in the constellation Hydra. NGC 3309 was discovered by astronomer John Herschel on March 24, 1835. Both galaxies dominate the center of the Hydra Cluster.

Radio Jet
NGC 3309 has a radio jet emerging out of its center. The jet is two-sided and the northeastern part of the jet appears to end in a spur. The southwestern part of the jet lies along a straight line. At a projected distance of about ~ from the nucleus, the jet appears to narrow into a nozzle-like structure before it expands into a lobe extending away from the galaxy.

The predominant part of the radio emission in the Hydra Cluster comes from NGC 3309. The radio emission in NGC 3309 may have been triggered by a recent perturbation with the giant spiral galaxy NGC 3312.

Globular clusters
NGC 3309 has an estimated population of about  globular clusters. Due to the influence of the nearby galaxy NGC 3311,  NGC 3309 may have been stripped of part of its original globular cluster system with some of the galaxy's globular clusters becoming members of  NGC 3311's population.

See also 
 List of NGC objects (3001–4000)
 Messier 87
 NGC 4874 
 NGC 4889

References

External links

Hydra Cluster
Hydra (constellation)
Radio galaxies
Elliptical galaxies
3309
31466
Astronomical objects discovered in 1835